Geckolepis maculata is a species of gecko that is commonly found in Madagascar. The gecko has large scales, large legs, and is chestnut-cream with black bands. Its common names are Peters's spotted gecko and fish-scale gecko.

References

External links

Geckolepis
Reptiles described in 1880
Taxa named by Wilhelm Peters